Regeneration (alternately called  The Regeneration) is a 1915 American silent biographical crime drama co-written and directed by Raoul Walsh. The film, which was the first full-length feature film directed by Walsh, stars Rockliffe Fellowes and Anna Q. Nilsson and was adapted for the screen by Carl Harbaugh and Walsh from the 1903 memoir My Mamie Rose, by Owen Frawley Kildare and the adapted 1908 play by Kildare and Walter C. Hackett.

It was feared lost until a copy was located by the Museum of Modern Art.

Plot
Cited as one of the first full-length gangster films, Regeneration tells the story of a poor orphan who rises to control the mob until he meets a woman for whom he wants to change.

The film is a "candid adaptation" of the autobiography of Owen Frawley Kildare, called the Kipling of the Bowery. The story follows the life of Owen (Rockliffe Fellowes), a young Irish American boy who is forced into a life of poverty after his mother dies.  As a result, Owen is forced to live on the street eventually turning to a life of crime.  Owen is eventually reformed, however, by the benevolent social worker Marie Deering (Anna Q. Nilsson). Also featured is a fire aboard an excursion ferry, much like the General Slocum disaster of 1904.

Deering's choices perplex her beau, a district attorney (Harbaugh) who has declared war on the gangs.

Cast

 Rockliffe Fellowes – Owen Conway
 James A. Marcus – Jim Conway
 Anna Q. Nilsson – Marie "Mamie Rose" Deering
 Maggie Weston – Maggie Conway
 Willam Sheer – Skinny
 Carl Harbaugh – District Attorney Ames
 John McCann – Owen Conway (10 years old)
 Harry McCoy – Owen Conway (17 years old)

Production
Set in New York City, Regeneration was shot on location in New York City's Lower East Side and used real prostitutes, gangsters and homeless people as extras. It is the first produced by Fox Film Corporation, a forerunner of the 20th Century Fox.

By 1915, 28-year-old director Raoul Walsh was in New York, with a three-picture contract with Fox Film Corporation for $400 a week - he was assigned Regeneration, to be the first feature-length gangster film in the United States. It was based on the book My Mamie Rose. Walsh's statement that he wrote the script was contradicted by other comments he made that he worked on it with Carl Harbaugh. Walsh had previously played John Wilkes Booth in The Birth of a Nation, and this was his first directing project on a feature, with him going on to film 140 other feature films.

When he filmed the scene with actors jumping off a boat into the river, fireboats and police showed up to calm the "crowds", and Walsh was taken to the local station house, amused. The studio "relished" the free publicity. French cinematographer Georges Benoit worked on the film as he his first Fox picture.

Release
Regeneration was originally released on September 13, 1915, to critical acclaim and was a box office hit.  It was re-released to theaters on January 12, 1919.

The release was "rife with the dramatic elements that pleased broad audiences of early cinema - violence and redemption, heavy sentiment, romance and tragedy". It opened to critical and box-office success. William Fox was so pleased, he bought Walsh a Simplex automobile and afforded him a salary of $800 a week, a small fortune in 1915. It cemented his reputation as an action director, although critics noted had "had a gift for revealing emotional vulnerability in even his roughest, toughest heroes."

Home media
In 2001, Regeneration was released on Region 1 DVD by Image Entertainment, along with the 1915 film Young Romance. The same two-film set was released on manufactured-on-demand DVD by Image Entertainment in 2012. The film is currently in the public domain.

Legacy
Regeneration was previously thought to be lost but was rediscovered in the 1970s. A copy of the film is preserved and held by the Museum of Modern Art Department of Film and the Film Preservation Associates. TimeOut wrote that "intriguingly, its eventful plotline is revealed as flatly contradicting the accepted synoptic account provided by Walsh in his autobiography. There the eventual fates of Nilsson and Fellowes are reversed, and an ending is transposed from another film entirely." The Guardian says "it's a milestone in the history of the gangster film, and with its religious themes, mobile camerawork, and potent evocation of its grim locations, it's the spiritual ancestor of Martin Scorsese's Mean Streets."

Time Out says it is notable for its "remarkable approach to physical casting, a robust treatment of violent action, and a sheer narrative pace to shame contemporary ponderousness."

In 2000, Regeneration was selected for preservation in the United States National Film Registry by the Library of Congress as being "culturally, historically or aesthetically significant".

References

External links

 Tony Tracy. "The Pauper and the Prince: Transformative Masculinity in Raoul Walsh's Regeneration." Film History: An International Journal, vol. 23 no. 4, 2011, p. 414-427.
Regeneration essay  by Marilyn Ann Moss at National Film Registry

 
 
glass slide for the 1919 rerelease version
Regeneration essay by Daniel Eagan in America's Film Legacy: The Authoritative Guide to the Landmark Movies in the National Film Registry, A&C Black, 2010 , pages 46–47 
The entire film on Internet Archive

1915 films
1910s biographical drama films
1915 crime drama films
1915 romantic drama films
Fox Film films
American biographical drama films
American crime drama films
1910s rediscovered films
American romantic drama films
American silent feature films
American black-and-white films
Films about orphans
American films based on actual events
Films based on adaptations
Films based on biographies
American films based on plays
Films directed by Raoul Walsh
Films set in New York City
Films shot in New York City
American gangster films
Irish-American mass media
United States National Film Registry films
Articles containing video clips
Rediscovered American films
1910s American films
Silent romantic drama films
Silent American drama films
1910s English-language films
English-language drama films